Out of Body is the seventh studio album by American rock band Needtobreathe, released on August 28, 2020, through Elektra Records.

Background 
Four years after the release of their last full-length studio album, Hard Love, and following some speculation by fans of the band, Needtobreathe announced the exit of band member Nathaniel "Bo" Rinehart on April 21, 2020. Soon after, the band released two singles, "Hang On" and "Seasons" on April 30, and announced the release of Out of Body later in the year. "Survival", featuring Drew & Ellie Holcomb, was released on June 11, and "Who Am I" was released on June 25. The final single, "Banks", was released on July 30.

Promotion 
The band hosted a ticketed livestream concert entitled "Celebrating Out of Body" on the day of the album's release, August 28, 2020. The band performed a series of two more ticketed interactive livestream concerts, entitled "All Dressed Up & Nowhere To Go" from their rehearsal space on January 21 and 22, 2021. As a result of the COVID-19 pandemic, the band was unable to tour Out of Body, however they performed three socially-distanced concerts at The Caverns in Pelham, Tennessee on March 12, 13 and 14, 2021. They later released Live From the Woods Vol. 2, composed of tracks recorded live at these shows.

Track listing

Personnel 
Needtobreathe
 Bear Rinehart – lead vocals, backing vocals (3), acoustic guitar (3, 4, 5, 9), electric guitar (4, 8), mandola (6), synthesizers (8)
 Josh Lovelace – backing vocals, acoustic piano (1, 3-11), organ (1, 2, 4, 5, 7, 8, 9), mandola (1, 8), Yamaha CP-70 electric grand piano (2, 3, 6, 10), synthesizers (3), acoustic guitar (6), marxophone (6), harmonica (8), Rhodes piano (10)
 Seth Bolt – backing vocals, bass (1-9, 11), electric guitar (10)

Additional musicians
 Cason Cooley – synthesizers (1, 2, 5, 7, 8, 10, 11), banjo (1, 10), backing vocals (1-4, 6, 7, 10), textures (2, 5, 8, 9), keyboards (3, 4), programming (3, 4, 5, 8-11), synth bass (3-7), acoustic piano (5, 7), dulcimer (5), acoustic guitar (6, 10), mandola (6), organ (10), sampling (10), mandolin (10), lap dulcimer (10)
 Tyler Burkum – electric guitars (1-10), acoustic guitar (1, 3, 5-8, 10), backing vocals (1-4, 6, 7, 9, 10, 11), guitars (11)
 Will Carter – banjo (1, 3, 4), pedal steel guitar (1, 3, 4), lap steel guitar (3, 4)
 Jeremy Lutito – drums (1-4, 6-11), synthesizers (2, 5, 7), programming (2, 3, 5-8), percussion (2, 3, 6, 8, 9, 11), snare drum (5), dulcimer (8), acoustic piano (10), sampling (10)
 Randall Harris – percussion (2, 4, 9, 11), backing vocals (2, 3, 6, 7, 9, 10, 11), banjo (3), acoustic guitar (8), drums (10)
 Drew Holcomb – lead and backing vocals (4)
 Ellie Holcomb – lead and backing vocals (4)
 Trent Dabbs – backing vocals (9)
 Jeremy Lister – backing vocals (8, 10, 11)
 Heather Rigdon – backing vocals (8, 10, 11)
 Ashley Wilcox – backing vocals (8, 10, 11)
 Amber Woodhouse – backing vocals (8, 10, 11)

Children's Choir on "Out of Body"
 Everett Cooley, Knox Cooley, Rowan Cooley, Henry Lovelace, Amelia Lutito and Isla Lutito 

Technical and Design
 Konrad Snyder – engineer
 Cason Cooley – engineer (1-9, 11), vocal engineer (4)
 Jeremy Lutito – engineer (1-9, 11)
 Tyler Burkum – engineer (10)
 Josh Lovelace – additional engineer (7)
 Sean Moffitt – mixing (1, 5-8, 10)
 Joe Visciano – mixing (2, 3, 4, 9, 11)
 Joe LaPorta – mastering at Sterling Sound (New York, NY)
 Will McDonald – A&R
 Allison Murphy – A&R administration 
 Jeremy Cowart – cover photography 
 Mary Hooper – creative direction, design
 Needtobreathe – creative direction
 Steve Bursky, Ryan Norris Anderson and Mallory Mason – management

Charts

Awards and accolades 
Out of Body won Rock/Contemporary Album of the Year and "Who Am I" won Rock/Contemporary Recorded Song of the Year at the 52nd GMA Dove Awards.

References 

2020 albums
Needtobreathe albums